Almir Bajramovski (born 21 May 1982) is a Macedonian retired football defender, who last played  for FK Skopje.

International career
He made his debut for North Macedonia in a January 2004 friendly match against China and has earned a total of 2 caps, scoring no goals. His second international was the second of two friendlies against China in January 2004.

References

External sources

1982 births
Living people
Sportspeople from Bitola
Association football defenders
Macedonian footballers
North Macedonia international footballers
FK Pelister players
FK Cementarnica 55 players
FK Vardar players
KF Shkëndija players
FK Skopje players
Macedonian First Football League players